In-sik, also spelled In-shik, is a Korean masculine given name. Its meaning differs based on the hanja used to write each syllable of the name. There are 29 hanja with the reading "in" and 16 hanja with the reading "sik" on the South Korean government's official list of hanja which may be registered for use in given names.

People with this name include:
Hwang In-shik (born 1940), South Korean hapkido teacher
Kim In-sik (born 1947), South Korean baseball manager
Chun In-shik (born 1968), South Korean sprint canoer
Lee In-sik (born 1983), South Korean footballer

See also
List of Korean given names

References

Korean masculine given names